Jerome Baker (also known as Jason Harris) is a Eugene, Oregon based glass blower and the founder of Jerome Baker Designs.

Baker started his career in glassblowing in 1991 by apprenticing with Bob Snodgrass. Since then, he has created blown glass artwork for celebrities, rock stars and sports figures.

In 2003, Baker was arrested on charges of selling drug paraphernalia. After being arrested, Baker focused his glass career on Maui Glass Designs, a company he created where he created luxury glass installations. After legalization in Oregon he reestablished himself as one of the top flame-workers/pipe-makers.

Baker is featured in Degenerate Art, a 2011 documentary by American pipe maker Aaron Golbert on the art and culture associated with glass pipes used for smoking cannabis.

Baker has won the 1996 High Times Cup "Best Product" and second place for "Best Booth". He has also won multiple High Times Cannabis Cups in Europe. In 2002 he won the High Times Cup "Best Glass" title. In 2018 Baker won first place in the Sanoma High Times Cup for "Best Glass" as well as a second place for "Best Glass" in Sacramento. 

Baker was one of the first glass artists to accept Bitcoin.

References

Glassblowers
Artists from Eugene, Oregon
Living people
Year of birth missing (living people)
Place of birth missing (living people)
Sculptors from Oregon
American glass artists